Fox Sports was an Israeli television sports channel owned by Fox Networks Group and was launched on 11 August 2000.

Programming rights

American Football
 National Football League

Australian Rules Football
 Australian Football League

Baseball
 Major League Baseball

Hockey
 National Hockey League

Golf
 PGA Championship 
 PGA EuroPro Tour 
 Women's PGA Championship 
 LPGA Tour

Rugby League
 National Rugby League

See also
 Fox Sports International
 Fox Sports Netherlands
 Fox Sports Turkey

References

External links
 Fox Sports official website
 

 

Television channels in Israel
Israel
Sports television in Israel
Television channels and stations established in 2000
Television channels and stations disestablished in 2020
Defunct television channels in Israel